The 2012 Oklahoma Democratic presidential primary took place on March 6, 2012. President Obama faced four challengers in the primary, with candidate Randall Terry taking 12 counties and candidate Jim Rogers winning in three counties. Candidates Bob Ely and Darcy Richardson also appeared on Oklahoma's ballot but failed to obtain a majority of votes in any county.

Results

See also
 2012 Oklahoma Republican presidential primary
 2012 United States presidential election in Oklahoma

References

Oklahoma
Democratic presidential primary
2012